= Allowed to keep terms =

Indian education process

Allowed to keep terms (ATKT) is a process in the Indian education system to allow students of pre-graduation and graduation to study in the next grade if they have failed in one to four subjects. The students must pass the papers they failed before entering into the next grade. For example, if a first-year bachelor's degree student fails to get passing marks in his four subjects, the student must pass those subjects before entering the third year, while the student can study in second year. It has backronyms like Tried and Keep trying.
